The SNCF X 2100 class of diesel multiple units were built by ANF between 1980–1983. They were used on TER Services, mostly in Brittany, Loire and around Limoges.

2100
Diesel multiple units of France